The 2016–17 Women's FA Cup was the 47th staging of the FA Women's Cup, a knockout cup competition for women's football teams in England. Arsenal were the defending champions, having beaten Chelsea 1–0 in the previous final. Manchester City won the cup by beating Birmingham City 4–1 in the final.

Teams 
A total of 254 teams had their entries to the tournament accepted by The Football Association. One hundred and sixty-two teams entered at the first or second round qualifying. Teams that play in the FA Women's Premier League Division One were given exemption to the Third Round Qualifying, while teams in the Northern and Southern Division entered at the First Round Proper. Teams in the FA WSL 2 were exempted to the Third Round Proper, with teams in the FA WSL 1 entering at the Fifth Round Proper.

The Second Round Qualifying saw eight ties cancelled due to the withdrawal of one of the teams, the First Round Proper saw two ties cancelled due to the resignation of Nuneaton Town and Forest Green Rovers before the season started, and the Third Round Proper saw one tie cancelled due to the withdrawal of Watford.

First round qualifying
There were only two first round qualifying matches, both of which were played on 4 September 2016.

Second round qualifying
Eighty matches were scheduled for the second qualifying round. The 160 teams taking part consisted of 158 teams exempted to this stage, plus the two match winners from the previous round. Most matches were played on Sunday 18 September 2016, the only exception being Bishop's Stortford v Bungay Town, which took place on the preceding Saturday.

Third round qualifying
Sixty four matches were scheduled for the third qualifying round. The 128 teams taking part consisted of 48 teams from the FA Women's Premier League Division One, plus the 80 match winners from the previous round. All 64 matches were played on Sunday 9 October 2016.

Fourth round qualifying
Thirty two matches were scheduled for the fourth qualifying round. Most matches were played on Sunday 13 November 2016, except three which were postponed to the following Sunday due to waterlogged pitches.

First round proper
Twenty eight matches were scheduled for the first round proper. The 56 teams taking part consists of 24 teams exempted to this stage, plus the 32 match winners from the previous round. Most matches were played on Sunday 4 December 2016, the only exception being Southampton Women v Swindon Town, which was postponed to the following Sunday.

Second round proper
Fourteen matches were scheduled for the second round proper. All 14 matches were played on Sunday 8 January 2017.

Third round proper
Twelve matches were scheduled for the third round proper. The 24 teams taking part consists of 10 teams exempted to this stage, plus the 14 match winners from the previous round. All 11 matches that took place were played on Sunday 5 February 2017.

Fourth round proper
Six matches were scheduled for the fourth round proper. All six matches were played on Sunday 19 February 2017.

Fifth round proper
Eight matches were scheduled for the fifth round proper. The 16 teams taking part consists of 10 teams exempted to this stage, plus the six match winners from the previous round. Most matches were played on Sunday 19 March 2017, the only exception being Manchester City v Reading, which took place on the preceding Saturday.

Sixth round proper
Four matches were scheduled for the sixth round proper. All four matches were played on Sunday 26 March 2017.

Semi-finals
The two semi-finals were played on Monday 17 April 2017.

Final

References

Women's FA Cup seasons
Cup